Frank D. Mahnic (1922-1991) was a member of the Ohio House of Representatives. He is also the founding partner of Frank Mahnic and Associates, located in Valley View, Ohio.

1922 births
Democratic Party members of the Ohio House of Representatives
1991 deaths
20th-century American politicians